Bruce Corman Norbert Greenwald (born August 15, 1946), is a professor at Columbia University's Graduate School of Business and an advisor at First Eagle Investment Management. He is, among others, the author of the books Value Investing: from Graham to Buffett and Beyond and Competition Demystified: A Radically Simplified Approach to Business Strategy.  He has been referred to by The New York Times as "a guru to Wall Street's gurus" and is a recognized authority on value investing, along with additional expertise in productivity and the economics of information.

Biography
Greenwald received a B.S. in electrical engineering from MIT in 1967, a M.S. in electrical engineering and M.P.A. from Princeton University in 1969, and a Ph.D. from MIT in economics in 1978. Before arriving at Columbia in 1991, Greenwald was a research economist at Bell Laboratories and later Bell Communications Research, and an assistant professor at Harvard Business School.

Books
Competition Demystified: A Radically Simplified Approach to Business Strategy (2005)
Value Investing: From Graham to Buffett and Beyond (2001)
Value Investing: From Graham to Buffett and Beyond 2nd Edition (2020)

See also
 Value investing
 Benjamin Graham
 David Dodd
 Warren Buffett

References

External links
 Bruce C. N. Greenwald, Columbia Business School

1946 births
Living people
20th-century American economists
21st-century American economists
American finance and investment writers
Columbia University faculty
Columbia Business School faculty
Harvard Business School faculty
MIT School of Engineering alumni
Princeton University School of Engineering and Applied Science alumni
Princeton School of Public and International Affairs alumni